The 2023 FIBA Basketball World Cup qualification process determined 30 of the 32 teams that qualified for the 2023 FIBA Basketball World Cup. As co-hosts, the Philippines and Japan each got an automatic qualification for the tournament when they were awarded the joint hosting rights along with co-host Indonesia.

Schedule of windows
Similar to the 2019 FIBA Basketball World Cup qualification, the matches were held in six windows over a 15-month period across all FIBA regions. 80 national teams competed during the qualification process. The schedule for the six windows was as follows:

Qualified teams

Co-host Indonesia did not gain direct entry to the main event and had to place within the top eight teams in the 2022 FIBA Asia Cup in order to qualify for the tournament as co-host. On 18 July 2022, Indonesia lost their spot after failing to reach the quarterfinals of the Asia Cup.

Format
The qualifiers format for the 2023 FIBA Basketball World Cup remained unchanged, with six windows over a 15-month period across the four regions of Africa, Americas, Asia (including Oceania) and Europe. The qualifiers took place from November 2021 to February 2023 with 80 national teams competing for a spot in the World Cup.

The road to the 2023 World Cup began in February 2020 with the start of the European pre-qualifiers, which ended in August 2021.

The draw for the qualifiers were held on 31 August 2021 in Mies, Switzerland.

Confederation qualifications

FIBA Africa

First round

Group A

Group B

Group C

Group D

Second round

Group E

Group F

FIBA Americas

First round

Group A

Group B

Group C

Group D

Second round

Group E

Group F

FIBA Asia and FIBA Oceania

First round

Group A

Group B

Group C

Group D

2022 FIBA Asia Cup – Qualification for Indonesia

Indonesia despite being one of the three co-host of the 2023 FIBA Basketball World Cup did not qualify for the main tournament outright. The route available to Indonesia to qualify for their first ever World Cup was to finish in the top eight of the 2022 FIBA Asia Cup tournament. However, the Indonesian team failed at this attempt and finished 11th, after a loss to China in the playoffs in July 2022.

Second round

Group E

Group F

FIBA Europe

First round

Group A

Group B

Group C

Group D

Group E

Group F

Group G

Group H

Second round

Group I

Group J

Group K

Group L

Statistical leaders

Player averages
As of 27 February 2023

Team averages

References

External links

FIBA